Poblenou Cemetery (Cementerio de Pueblo Nuevo in Spanish, Cementiri de Poblenou in Catalan) is located in the neighbourhood of the same name in Barcelona. It is also called East Cemetery (Cementiri de l'Est) or General Cemetery (Cementiri General). It is located in calle de Taulat, with the main entrance at Avenida Icària.

The first cemetery at this location was built in 1775, located outside the city's perimeter wall, as the state of churchyard graves inside the old city was considered unsanitary. After the first cemetery was destroyed by Napoleon's troops in 1813, the Italian architect  was commissioned to rebuild it, and the new site was reconsecrated by Bishop Pau de Sitjar i Ruata on 15 April 1819. It was formally opened in 1898 by the Bishop of Barcelona Josep Climent i Avinent.

The cemetery consists of two large sections: at the front Ginesi created egalitarian terraces of burial niches, while at the rear there is an area of individual monuments and mausolea, crafted for the aesthetic tastes and aspirations of the wealthy bourgeoisie, merchants and manufacturers of the city. A third, narrow section along the South wall mixes niches, monuments and common graves.

The sculpture above the grave of Josep Llaudet Soler is often cited as Poblenou's best-known monument. Known as The Kiss of Death (El petó de la mort in Catalan or El beso de la muerte in Spanish), the work dates to 1930 and depicts a winged skeleton kissing the cheek of a young man's apparently lifeless body. The name of the artist Jaume Barba is carved into the base, though some believe the work is the idea of Joan Fontbernat.

Notable burials 
 Valentí Almirall i Llozer, Catalan nationalist and politician
 Lola Anglada, illustrator
 , author
 , "Santet", a young man of Barcelona of humble origin who died at age 22, to whom miracles are popularly attributed
 , musician and politician
 , mayor of Barcelona
 José Luis de Vilallonga, writer, actor and aristocrat
 Josep Llimona i Bruguera, sculptor
 Miguel Llobet, classical guitarist
 Narcís Oller, author
 , mayor of Barcelona
 Jordi Sabater i Pi, ecologist and primatologist
 Mary Santpere, actress
  (Cassen), actor
 Carmen Tórtola Valencia, ballerina

See also 
 Montjuïc Cemetery

References

External links 

 
 Cementiris de Barcelona S.A.
 The Poblenou Cemetery Route

El Poblenou
Sant Martí (district)
Cemeteries in Catalonia
Buildings and structures in Barcelona
1775 establishments in Spain
1819 establishments in Spain
Tourist attractions in Barcelona